Erueti Lep (also Îlot Erouéti, Éruéti) is a small uninhabited island in the Pacific Ocean, a part of the Shefa Province of Vanuatu.

Geography
The island lies 16 km south of Port-Vila in Efate Island. The estimated terrain elevation above the sea level is some 10 meters

References

Islands of Vanuatu
Shefa Province
Uninhabited islands of Vanuatu